Mário André Rodrigues João best known as Marito (born September 30, 1977) is a retired Angolan football goalkeeper. He has played for Angola national team.

National team statistics

References

External links

1977 births
Living people
Footballers from Luanda
Angolan footballers
Angola international footballers
1998 African Cup of Nations players
Association football goalkeepers